Hamlet is a 1961 German mystery drama film directed by Franz Peter Wirth. The screenplay by Wirth is adapted from the William Shakespeare tragedy of the same name.

Release
The film was initially broadcast on television on 1 January 1961 in West Germany before being released theatrically in the United States in 1962.

Plot

Prince Hamlet of Denmark returns home to find his father murdered and his mother remarrying the murderer, his uncle.

Cast
Maximilian Schell as Hamlet
Hans Caninenberg as Claudius
Wanda Rotha as Gertrude
 as Ophelia
Franz Schafheitlin as Polonius
 as Laertes
Karl Michael Vogler as Horatio
Eckart Dux as Rosencrantz
 as Guildenstern
Karl Lieffen as Osric
 as Bernardo
 as Francisco
Alexander Engel as Ghost
 as Actor
Paul Verhoeven as First gravedigger
Johannes Buzalski as Second gravedigger

Reception
Bill Gibron, writing for DVD Verdict, said that "In the literary life, you either love Shakespeare or you don't, and the Germans definitely do not. This 1960 television version of the Bard's brainchild is so cold and calculated it's like Berlin in February." FlickFilosopher wrote that "this is a take on Hamlet that could otherwise be construed as cruel and unusual punishment." Kevin Murphy of Mystery Science Theater 3000 wrote, "Leave it to Germany to turn a bleak brooding play into an even bleaker, broodinger movie-of-the-week for German television. This thing, made in the early '60s, has 'we're still really sorry for the war and feel terrible' all over it."

Dub
Hamlet was dubbed into English under the supervision of Edward Dmytryk. Schell provided his own voice: among the other actors used for the dub were Ricardo Montalbán (Claudius) and John Banner (Polonius). This dub was later featured in a season 10 episode of Mystery Science Theater 3000, its length cut to fit the show's 92-minute runtime.

References

External links

1961 films
1961 television films
1961 television plays
1961 drama films
German drama films
German films based on plays
German television films
German-language television shows
Films based on Hamlet
Films directed by Franz Peter Wirth
Television shows based on plays
West German films
1960s German films
Das Erste original programming